Eric Verner Wennström (10 March 1909 – 8 October 1990) was a Swedish hurdler. He held the 110 m hurdles world record from 1929 to 1934 and competed in the 1928 Summer Olympics.

Career

Wennström became an elite hurdler at a young age, challenging Sweden's established top hurdler Sten Pettersson and winning his first national title in 1927 as an 18-year-old. He represented Sweden at the 1928 Summer Olympics in Amsterdam and nearly qualified for the final, placing third in his semi-final.

Wennström reached his peak in 1929, consistently running under 15 seconds and winning another Swedish national title; finally on 25 August, in a dual meet against Norway at Stockholm, he broke the world record with his time of 14.4. Although a number of other athletes, starting with Earl Thomson in 1920, had run the slightly shorter 120 yd (109.7 m) hurdles in 14.4, Wennström was the first to do so over the metric distance. There were some doubts about the validity of Wennström's mark, with wind assistance and unreliable clocks cited as possible factors in it, but the International Amateur Athletic Federation, responsible for officially ratifying world records, found no problems with the time and accepted it.

Wennström lost his best shape after the 1929 season and never regained it, although he did become Swedish champion for a third and final time in 1931.

References

1909 births
1990 deaths
Athletes from Stockholm
Swedish male hurdlers
Athletes (track and field) at the 1928 Summer Olympics
Olympic athletes of Sweden
World record setters in athletics (track and field)